Rex Lyle Carter (June 20, 1925 – June 9, 2014) was an American lawyer and politician.

Born in Honea Path, South Carolina, Anderson County, South Carolina, Carter served in the United States Coast Guard during World War II. He then received his bachelor's degree from Erskine College and then his law degree from University of South Carolina School of Law. Carter then practiced law in Greenville, South Carolina. He served in the South Carolina House of Representatives, as a Democrat, from 1953 until 1980 and was speaker. He died in Greenville, South Carolina.

Notes

1925 births
2014 deaths
People from Honea Path, South Carolina
Politicians from Greenville, South Carolina
Military personnel from South Carolina
Erskine College alumni
University of South Carolina School of Law alumni
South Carolina lawyers
Speakers of the South Carolina House of Representatives
Democratic Party members of the South Carolina House of Representatives
20th-century American lawyers